Zayed Al Awwal Secondary School (ZASS) (in Arabic: مدرسة زايد الأول للتعليم الثانوي) is a public school founded in 1968. It is located in Al Ain, United Arab Emirates close to United Arab Emirates University and is part of Abu Dhabi Education Council. The school had another name before. It was Zayed Old Al Awwal Secondary School (in Arabic: مدرسة زايد الأول الكبير للتعليم الثانوي).The school was named to honor Sheikh Zayed bin Sultan Al Nahyan who was the principal architect of United Arab Emirates. Many politicians studied there. The school is based on Emirati-style schools. Since its inauguration, the school has gained a good reputation. It currently has 750 students on roll. It has now made progress in the rebuilding of the infrastructure and education was recently graded highly. It does not have music and arts departments, while the school has much participation. The school provides specialist teaching through several specialist teachers.

Awards and achievements
The school won Al Ain Chess Club Award in 2009. It established two exhibitions in 2009 and 2010. The second exhibition made magazines wonder. The school was awarded by the Ministry of Culture, Youth & Community Development in 2009 for best UAE folk costumes, painting, poetry, reciting and design. The school won The 3rd National Information Technology Competition for School Students in 2010.

Academics
 Arabic
 English
 Math
 Islamic
 Biology
 Physics
 Chemistry
 Geology
 History
 Geography
 Psychology & Sociology

Athletics
 Academic Team
 Football
 Bowling

References

External links 
http://www.arabianbusiness.com/arabic/591141
http://alainchess.com/online/index.php?option=com_content&task=view&id=77&Itemid=1
http://www.arabianbusiness.com/arabic/591141
http://www.mcycd.ae/Lists/News/DispForm.aspx?ID=200

Schools in the Emirate of Abu Dhabi
1968 establishments in the Trucial States